The following is a list of neighborhoods in Newark, New Jersey, United States within its five political wards. each with distinct neighborhoods.

North Ward

 Broadway
 Forest Hill
 Mount Pleasant
 Roseville
 Seventh Avenue
 Woodside

South Ward

 Clinton Hill
 Dayton
 Port Newark
 South Broad Valley
 Weequahic

Central Ward

 The Coast/Lincoln Park
 Downtown Newark
 Government Center
 Springfield/Belmont
 University Heights
 Teachers Village
Washington Park

East Ward

 Four Corners
 Five Corners
 Gateway Center
 The Ironbound

West Ward
 Fairmount
 Ivy Hill
 Vailsburg
 West Side

References